Max Cooper may refer to:

 Max Cooper (electronica musician) (born 1980), European electronica and techno musician
 Max Dale Cooper (born 1933), American immunologist
 Maximillion Cooper (born 1972), founder of the Gumball 3000 brand
 Max Cooper (Wild Force Power Rangers), a protagonist in the television series Power Rangers Wild Force